Carol Miller is an American radio personality and disc jockey. She has been a steady presence on rock radio stations in the New York City area since 1973. She began her broadcasting career as a college undergraduate, and stayed with it even after she completed graduate studies in law school. She rose to prominence at WPLJ-FM and then moved to WNEW-FM. She has been heard most recently on WAXQ-FM ("Q-104.3") and Sirius XM.

Miller is an ardent champion of classic rock music. In addition to her live radio program, she also helms a weekly Led Zeppelin tribute show, Get the Led Out, which has been in syndication since 1984. Her autobiography, Up All Night: My Life and Times in Rock Radio, was published in 2012.

Early life
Miller was born in 1950, in Queens, New York. At the age of 10, she and her family moved to New Hyde Park in Long Island, where she attended Herricks High School. Later she went to the University of Pennsylvania and earned a degree in biology. While there, she developed a love of broadcasting by volunteering at the college radio station, and, in late 1971, she began working professionally at the progressive rock station WMMR in Philadelphia. She returned to New York to pursue a degree from Hofstra Law School, but still maintained her working position at WMMR. With help from her friend and fellow disc jockey Dennis Elsas, she even took on a second job at WMMR's sister station in New York, WNEW-FM.

Radio career
Miller made her New York radio debut at WNEW-FM in 1973, where she worked for a little over a year. 

She worked for the short-lived WQIV-FM in 1974, and began at WPLJ in the following year. Her evening show was part of a talent roster on WPLJ that proved very successful, and included Tony Pigg, Pat St. John, and John Zacherle, and Jim Kerr.

One of Miller's favorite musical artists is Bruce Springsteen, and while she was at WPLJ she became the very public voice of a drive to make "Born to Run" the New Jersey state anthem. The effort was ultimately unsuccessful, but on June 12, 1979, the New Jersey General Assembly acknowledged its widespread support and declared "Born to Run" to be the state's "Unofficial Youth Rock Anthem".

She returned to WNEW-FM in 1983. In 1985, she even found a niche on television, reporting on new music in 90-second spots for Entertainment Tonight.

In addition to her live show, she began a feature on her program, Get the Led Out, in 1984. The now widely syndicated show, Carol Miller's Get The Led Out (United Stations Radio Networks), chronicles the history of Led Zeppelin. 

Miller currently appears on New York radio station WAXQ ("Q-104.3") as well as Sirius XM’s Deep Tracks, Classic Rewind, and other channels. She still plays her preferred musical style: "Classic rock is not an oldies format. It’s a lifestyle format. I don’t see it as part of the past at all."

Miller's memoir, which also chronicles her extensive battles with breast and endometrial cancers, Up All Night: My Life and Times in Rock Radio, was published in 2012.

In 2022, Miller was inducted into the highly selective Radio Hall of Fame.

References

External links

Living people
American radio DJs
Queens College, City University of New York alumni
Radio personalities from New York City
University of Pennsylvania School of Arts and Sciences alumni
Year of birth missing (living people)
Herricks High School alumni